Neoberlesia is a genus of mites in the family Laelapidae.

Species
 Neoberlesia equitans Berlese, 1892

References

Laelapidae